The following is a list of episodes for the reality television cooking series Halloween Baking Championship on Food Network.

Series overview

Season 1 (2015)
Seven bakers and chefs competed in a four-episode baking tournament. One person got eliminated every week until the final episode where one person was eliminated early on and the final three compete for the grand prize of $25,000. Judges for this season are Carla Hall, Ron Ben-Israel, and Sherry Yard.

Contestants
1st - Rudy Martinez, Home Bakery Owner from Queens, New York
2nd - Scott Breazeale, Executive Chef from Plymouth, Michigan
3rd - Jason Hisley, Bakery Owner and chef from Baltimore, Maryland
4th - Ashlee Prisbrey, Baker from Salt Lake City, Utah
5th - Audrey Alfaro, Home Baker from Spokane, Washington
6th - Erin Cooper, Baker from Owings Mills, Maryland
7th - Jennifer Petty, Home Bakery Owner from West Covina, California

Episodes

Results

: Ashlee was eliminated after the finale Preheat.

 (WINNER) The contestant won the whole competition.
‡ The contestant won the Pre-Heat challenge.
 (WIN) The contestant won the Main Heat challenge.
 (HIGH) The contestant had one of the best dishes for that week.
 (IN) The contestant performed well enough to move on to the next week.  
 (LOW) The contestant had one of the bottom dishes for that week, but was not eliminated.
 (OUT) The contestant was eliminated for worst dish.

Season 2 (2016)
Seven bakers competed in a five-episode baking tournament. In this season they incorporated midround twists (usually an ingredient the contestants had to add to their confection). The winner got $25,000. Judges for this season are Carla Hall, Sandra Lee, and Damiano Carrara.

Contestants
1st - Michelle Antonishek, Executive Pastry Chef from Cotulla, Texas
2nd - Tamara Brown, Home Baker from Baldwin Park, California
3rd - Veronica von Borstel, Cake Designer from San Diego, California
4th - John Schopp, Pastry Instructor from Roanoke, Virginia
5th - Amy Strickland, Bakery Owner from Lake City, Florida 
6th - Damien Bagley, Pastry Instructor from Las Vegas, Nevada
7th - Brad Rudd, Bakery Manager from Encino, California
: Amy Strickland withdrew from the competition, just before the start of the third episode, due to stress concerns since she was 6 months pregnant.

Episodes

Results

: No one was eliminated at the end of Week 3.

 (WINNER) The contestant won the whole competition.
‡ The contestant won the Pre-Heat challenge.
 (WIN) The contestant won the Main Heat challenge.
 (HIGH) The contestant had one of the best dishes for that week.
 (IN) The contestant performed well enough to move on to the next week.  
 (LOW) The contestant had one of the bottom dishes for that week, but was not eliminated.
 (OUT) The contestant was eliminated for worst dish.
 (WDR) The contestant voluntarily left the competition.

Season 3 (2017)
Eight bakers competed in a six-episode baking tournament. One person got eliminated every week until the final three compete for $25,000. Judges for this season are Carla Hall, Zac Young, and Lorraine Pascale.

Contestants
1st - Jasmin Bell, Pastry Instructor from Seattle, Washington
2nd - Jonathan Elias, Pastry Chef from Troy, Michigan
3rd - Jessica Scott, Executive Pastry Chef from San Diego, California
4th - Ray Vizcaino, Cake Decorator from San Diego, California
5th - Tyler Davis, Pastry Chef from St. Louis, Missouri
6th - Dina Melendez, Pastry Chef from Brooklyn, New York
7th - Cliff Butler, Pastry Chef from Austin, Texas
8th - Andrea Kratville, Home Baker from Sonora, California

Episodes

Results

: There were no top honors announced the first episode, just the winner and the bottom two.

 (WINNER) The contestant won the whole competition.
‡ The contestant won the Pre-Heat challenge.
 (WIN) The contestant won the Main Heat challenge.
 (HIGH) The contestant had one of the best dishes for that week.
 (IN) The contestant performed well enough to move on to the next week.  
 (LOW) The contestant had one of the bottom dishes for that week, but was not eliminated.
 (OUT) The contestant was eliminated for worst dish.

Season 4 (2018)
Eight bakers, professional and home cooks, competed in a six episode tournament. The winner got $25,000 and a spot in Food Network Magazine. The same judges as last year return: Carla Hall, Zac Young, and Lorraine Pascale.

Contestants
1st - Lyndsy McDonald, Executive Pastry Chef from Sarasota, Florida
2nd - Michelle Honeman, Home Baker from Beaverton, Oregon 
3rd - Jamal Lake, Bakery Owner from West Palm Beach, Florida
4th - Steven Vargas Jr., Pastry Cook from Houston, Texas
5th - Brenda Villacorta, Pastry Chef from New York, New York 
6th - Cicely Austin, University Executive Pastry Chef from Anderson, South Carolina
7th - Andrew Fuller, Home Bakery Owner from Des Moines, Iowa
8th - Brian Fishman, Bakery Owner from Long Island, New York

Episodes

Results

: There were no "best dishes" announced the second and third episodes, just the winner and the bottom two.

 (WINNER) The contestant won the whole competition.
‡ The contestant won the Pre-Heat challenge.
 (WIN) The contestant won the Main Heat challenge.
 (HIGH) The contestant had one of the best dishes for that week.
 (IN) The contestant performed well enough to move on to the next week.  
 (LOW) The contestant had one of the bottom dishes for that week, but was not eliminated.
 (OUT) The contestant was eliminated for worst dish.

Season 5 (2019)

Contestants

Episodes

Judges' Costumes
Episode 1: Carla Hall as a chef survived a lobster attack, Zac Young as the big, bad wolf disguised as Granny, Katie Lee as Captain Judgmental 
Episode 2: Carla Hall as Mother Earth, Zac Young as a pink flamingo, Katie Lee as a Pop art painting 
Episode 3: Carla Hall as Morticia Addams, Zac Young as Uncle Fester, Katie Lee as Wednesday Addams
Episode 4: Carla Hall as Ghost Reporter, Zac Young as Liza Minnelli, Katie Lee as Injured Influencer 
Episode 5: Carla Hall as the Ice Queen, Zac Young as a Romance Novel Hunk, Katie Lee as Vampire Nanny (Scary Poppins)
Episode 6: Carla Hall as a Shower Poof (loofah), Zac Young as Croquembouche, Katie Lee as Candy Corn

Results

 (WINNER) The contestant won the whole competition.
‡ The contestant won the Pre-Heat challenge.
 (WIN) The contestant won the Main Heat challenge.
 (HIGH) The contestant had one of the best dishes for that week.
 (IN) The contestant performed well enough to move on to the next week.  
 (LOW) The contestant had one of the bottom dishes for that week, but was not eliminated.
 (OUT) The contestant was eliminated for worst dish.

Season 6 (2020)

Contestants
1st - Sinai Vespie, pastry chef from Mishawaka, Indiana
2nd - Renee Loranger, pastry chef from Waveland, Mississippi
3rd - Aaron Clouse, pastry chef from Columbus, Ohio
4th - Michelle Lee, sous chef from Monterey, California
5th - Michael Gaddy, pastry chef from Dade City, Florida
6th - Brian Bosch, event designer from Santa Ana, California
7th - Tamara Brown, from Los Angeles, California
8th - Holly Braddock, pastry chef from Myrtle Beach, South Carolina
9th - Nerwan Khalife, pastry chef from Bronx, New York
10th - Edward Cunningham, railroad heavy equipment operator from Chicago, Illinois

Episodes

Judges' Costumes
Episode 1: Carla Hall as Halloween Baking Bubbly (bottle of champagne), Zac Young as a spooky ballerina, Stephanie Boswell as Cereal Killer
Episode 2: Carla Hall as Tough Cookie, Zac Young as a Woodland Elf, Stephanie Boswell as Sasquatch Supermodel
Episode 3: Carla Hall as a Vampire CEO, Zac Young as a Vegas vampire, Stephanie Boswell as a Vampire Sorority Girl
Episode 4: Carla Hall as Baaaddd Bat, Zac Young as Cool Cat, Stephanie Boswell as Fierce Falcon
Episode 5: Carla Hall as Halloween Devil Diva, Zac Young as Dastardly Devil, Stephanie Boswell as Devil Bride
Episode 6: Carla Hall as Glamorous Octopus, Zac Young as Dr. Jekyll and Mr. Hyde, Stephanie Boswell as Pirate Captain
Episode 7: Carla Hall as Miss Universe, Zac Young as Liberace's ghost, Stephanie Boswell as Queen of the Underworld

Results

 (WINNER) The contestant won the whole competition.
 (WIN) The contestant won the Main Heat challenge.
 (HIGH) The contestant had one of the best dishes for that week.
 (IN) The contestant performed well enough to move on to the next week.  
 (LOW) The contestant had one of the bottom dishes for that week, but was not eliminated.
 (OUT) The contestant was eliminated for worst dish.

Season 7 (2021)

Contestants
1st - Renee Loranger, pastry chef from Waveland, Mississippi (fan favorite from season 6)
2nd - Guillermo Salinas from Jackson, Mississippi
2nd - Adina Schaefer, executive pastry chef from Los Angeles, California
4th - Megan Baker, bakery owner from Minneapolis, Minnesota
5th - Ashley Wong from Fremont, California
6th - Wes Dills from Austin, Texas
7th - Sherelle Morrison from Indian Land, South Carolina
8th - Jocelyn Jung, bakery owner from San Diego, California (fan favorite from season 5)
9th - Anirudh Mamtora from Cherry Hill, New Jersey
9th - Nicole Proske from Miami, Florida
11th - Steven Sechoka from Boston, Massachusetts
12th - Paul Allicock from Miami, Florida
: Jocelyn from season 5 and Renee from season 6 were brought back to the show on episode 2.
: Nicole and Anirudh were both eliminated after a Sudden Death round.

Episodes

Judges' Costumes
Episode 1: Carla Hall as a bloody victim, Zac Young as Chucky, Stephanie Boswell as the final girl
Episode 2: Carla Hall and Stephanie Boswell as terrifying twins (inspired by the Grady Twins from The Shining), Zac Young as an archaeologist (inspired by Indiana Jones)
Episode 3: Carla Hall as an evil cheerleader, Zac Young as a vampire glam rock star, Stephanie Boswell as Mistress of the Dark (inspired by Elvira)
Episode 4: Carla Hall as an undead fitness instructor, Zac Young as a voodoo doll, Stephanie Boswell as goblin king (inspired by Jareth from the 1986 movie Labyrinth)
Episode 5: Carla Hall as dancing queen who only made it to seventeen, Zac Young as wolfman, Stephanie Boswell as bloody prom queen (inspired by Carrie White)
Episode 6: Carla Hall as Deadly Disco Queen, Zac Young as Creepy Poodle, Stephanie Boswell as Creepy Clown
Episode 7: Carla Hall as cat lady, Zac Young as devilish boss, Stephanie Boswell as Dollface

Results

 (WINNER) The contestant won the whole competition.
 (WIN) The contestant won the Main Heat challenge.
 (HIGH) The contestant had one of the best dishes for that week.
 (IN) The contestant performed well enough to move on to the next week.
 (LOW) The contestant competed in a Sudden Death round, but was not eliminated.
 (LOW) The contestant had one of the bottom dishes for that week, but was not eliminated.
 (OUT) The contestant competed in a Sudden Death round and was eliminated for the worst dish.
 (OUT) The contestant was eliminated for worst dish.
‡ The contestant won the Pre-Heat challenge.

Season 8 (2022)

Contestants
1st - Blayre Wright, bakery owner from Lancaster, Pennsylavania
2/3/4th - Zac Mercer, bakery owner from Denver, Colorado
2/3/4th - Lauren Rodgers, bakery owner from Olympia, Washington
2/3/4th - Jill Davis, bakery owner from Owosso, Michigan
5th - Kristi Descher, pastry chef from Valencia, California
6th - Alexey Ivanov, home baker from Brooklyn, New York
7th - Lola Forbes, bakery co-owner from Mesa, Arizona
8th - Maricsa Trejo, bakery owner from Richardson, Texas
9th - Justin Dominguez, bakery owner and cake artist from San Antonio, Texas
9th - Margarita Garcia, pastry chef from Miami, Florida
11th - Marcus Brackett, self-taught baker from Rockville, Maryland
12th - AJ DeDiego, home baker from Atlanta, Georgia

Episodes

Results

 (WINNER) The contestant won the whole competition.
 (WIN) The contestant won the Main Heat challenge.
 (HIGH) The contestant had one of the best dishes for that week.
 (IN) The contestant performed well enough to move on to the next week.  
 (LOW) The contestant competed in a Bake Off, but was not eliminated.
 (LOW) The contestant had one of the bottom dishes for that week, but was not eliminated.
 (OUT) The contestant competed in a Bake Off and was eliminated for the worst dish.
 (OUT) The contestant was eliminated for worst dish.
‡The Baker won the Pre-Heat

References

External links
 
 

Halloween
Season 1